Fernando Pascoal Neves (12 July 1947 – 16 December 1973), commonly known as Pavão, was a Portuguese footballer who played as a central midfielder for FC Porto in the Primeira Liga.

Career
Born in Chaves, Pavão began playing football in his local team Chaves. In 1964 he entered Porto's youth academy and after one season, joined the senior team eventually playing for the club his entire professional career.

In December 1973, he collapsed after completing a pass during the 13th minute of a league match against Vitória Setúbal at Estádio das Antas, dying of a heart attack at age 26.

Honours
Porto
Taça de Portugal: 1967–68

References

External links

1947 births
People from Chaves, Portugal
1973 deaths
Portuguese footballers
Association football players who died while playing
Sport deaths in Portugal
FC Porto players
Association football midfielders
Portugal international footballers
Sportspeople from Vila Real District